Edmund Ingalls (26/27 June 1598 –  16 September 1648) was a founder of Lynn, Massachusetts. Born to Robert Ingalls in Skirbeck, Boston, Lincolnshire, England, he arrived in Salem, Massachusetts in Governor John Endicott's company in 1628.  It is believed that he and his family came with Endicott and a party of about 100 in the "Abigail," which sailed from Weymouth and arrived at Salem, Sept. 6, 1628, after a voyage of 11 weeks.  The belief that Edmund and his brother, Francis Ingalls, with their families, came on the "Abigail" is based on the fact that no other ship arrived from England until June 30, 1629, and Alonzo Lewis, the historian of Lynn, refers to manuscripts showing that Edmund and Francis settled in Saugus (Lynn) as early as the first of June.

The colonization of Massachusetts was only partly of religious inspiration. It was largely commercial and largely appealing to men who desired more freedom and especially more opportunity. A company had obtained a grant of a strip of the sea-coast. It wanted to get settlers upon the land in order to develop trade. It offered to assist them in getting there and to them it promised 10 acres of land.

To those who could pay their own way it agreed to allow 50 acres. Edmund and Francis Ingalls were evidently of the latter class, since when the allotments of land were finally made they jointly received 120 acres. The Ingalls' family was economically well off enough to employ some servants and write wills, even leaving some of their wealth to the poor.

In 1629, Edmund, his brother Francis, and four others, founded the settlement of Lynn, Massachusetts. In the opening pages of "The History of Lynn, MA" by Alonzo Lewis and James R. Newhall, appears the following: "The first white men known to have been inhabitants of Lynn were Edmund Ingalls and his brother Francis Ingalls."

Edmund and Francis, arriving in (Saugus) Lynn, were received kindly by the Native Americans, who were of the Pawtucket tribe, and the Native Americans gave them leave to dwell there and occupy what land they would.

Edmund built his home beside a sedgy pond, which became known as Ingalls pond, and so appeared on early maps, but is now called Goldfish pond. The site of the house that Edmund Ingalls built was between Nos. 33 and 43 of Bloomfield street in Lynn.

It is of record that Edmund had a malt house, and it may be surmised that he knew how to malt grain and brew beer, and probably did so. It is also probable that he drank what he brewed. According to the accounts there was a "festive" time, with much hilarity and profanity, when his house was erected with the assistance of his friends. It is likely, therefore, that Edmund Ingalls was not a strict Puritan.

Edmund was reportedly of good character, although it was found in a court record that "20/4/1646, Edmund Ingalls was fined for bringing home sticks in both his arms on the Sabbath day from Mr. Holyokes rails, witnesses Joseph Mood, Obadaya Mood, Jane Mood". This is an example of Puritan Blue Laws. Edmund's name is often found on the town records showing him to be one of the prominent citizens.

Edmund Ingalls lost his life in March 1648, by falling with his horse through a defective bridge over the Saugus River where it is crossed by the road that is now Boston Street. He was probably then about 53 years of age. His eldest son, Robert, who was then 27 years of age petitioned the General Court for damages in the amount of £100 in accordance with a law just previously enacted in the Colony. This may have been the first claim of that sort in New England.

His will was probated on September 16, 1648, and his estate appraised at a value of £135.

Edmund Ingalls is recognized as an early American founder by The Order of the Founders and Patriots of America. He is the ancestor of Charles Ingalls, of American author Laura Ingalls Wilder, of Revolutionary War patriot Jonathan Ingalls, and of Salem Witch Trials victim Martha Carrier.

References 

1598 births
1648 deaths
People from Boston, Lincolnshire
People of colonial Massachusetts
Deaths by drowning
Accidental deaths in Massachusetts